M. Roy Wilson M.D., M.S. (born November 28, 1953) is the President of the Wayne State University.

Education
Wilson was born in Yokohama, Japan. He completed his undergraduate degree at Allegheny College in Meadville, Pennsylvania in 1976. Soon after graduating, he was accepted to Harvard Medical School, where he received his M.D. in 1980. It was there he trained as an ophthalmologist and researcher. Wilson is an accomplished researcher, focused on glaucoma and blindness in West Africa, the Caribbean and urban communities in the United States. Most of his scientific and service contributions have been in developing countries. In 1985, M. Roy Wilson attended the University of California, Los Angeles to complete his master's degree in epidemiology. He graduated in 1990.

Career
Wilson was unanimously elected President of Wayne State University by the Board of Governors on June 5, 2013. He assumed the presidency on August 1, 2013.

Prior to joining Wayne State, President Wilson served as deputy director for strategic scientific planning and program coordination at the National Institute on Minority Health and Health Disparities of National Institutes of Health.

Previous career

(One time) Chancellor - University of Colorado Denver
Former Chair of Board of Directors - University of Colorado Hospital
Dean of School of Medicine - Creighton University
Vice President - Creighton University
President - Texas Tech University Health Sciences Center
(Part-time) Former President - Charles R. Drew University of Medicine and Science in L.A.
Chairman of Board of Directors - Charles R. Drew University of Medicine and Science in L.A.

Achievements and awards

The Institute of Medicine of the National Academy of Sciences – Member
The International Glaucoma Research Society – Member
The American Ophthalmological Society - Member
Committee of the NIH-funded Ocular Hypertension Treatment Study - The executive
The Data Monitoring and Oversight Committee of the NIH-funded Los Angeles Latino Eye Study - Chair
The Advisory councils of NIMHD - Member
The NIH Director's Working Group on Diversity in the Biomedical Research Workforce – Member
Best Doctors in America Award – 14 consecutive years
American Academy of Ophthalmology - Senior Achievement Award
The Minority Health Institute - Distinguished Physician Award
The Association of American Medical Colleges - Herbert W. Nickens Award
National Institutes of Health - NIH Director's Award

References

Further reading
 

Wayne State University people
Living people
Allegheny College alumni
University of California alumni
Harvard Medical School alumni
American corporate directors
1953 births
American ophthalmologists
Members of the National Academy of Medicine